Rozen Maiden is a manga series by Peach-Pit and was serialized in Gentosha's Monthly Comic Birz between issues September 2002 and July 2007. It has been adapted into a radio drama and an anime. The series follows middle school student Jun Sakurada who has withdrawn from society after being persecuted by his classmates. He is then chosen to become the master of the sentient bisque doll Shinku, one of the seven Rozen Maiden set who must compete with her sisters in order to become a perfected doll dubbed as Alice.

Gentosha compiled the individual chapters into eight tankōbon volumes released between March 2003 and June 2007. These volumes were later recompiled into seven shinsōban volumes by Shueisha and released between April 2008 and November 2008. Tokyopop localized Gentosha's tankōbon volumes in English for North America and released them between May 2006 and May 2008. Tokyopop's translations were distributed in Australasia by Madman Entertainment. The series has also been localized in languages such as Chinese, French, and Italian.

In March 2008, Peach-Pit published a one-shot titled  in the 16th issue of Weekly Young Jump. In the following issue, a serialization for Rozen Maiden was announced. Serialization began in Weekly Young Jump's 20th issue in 2008. The second series was published under the katakana for Rozen Maiden. The series has been localized in other languages such as Italian, French, and Chinese.

Two spin-off anthology series were created based on the second series. It began serialization in Ribons January 2012 issue. It began serialization in Miracle Jump issue 12 released on December 27, 2012. Peach-Pit has also published a one-shot in the October 2013 issue of Ribon which focuses on the Rozen Maiden's past.

Volume list

First series

Tankōbon

Shinsōban

Second series

Dolls Talk

Zero

References
General

Specific

Volumes
Rozen Maiden